The University of Coimbra General Library (Biblioteca Geral da Universidade de Coimbra) is the central library of the University of Coimbra, in Coimbra, Portugal.

Even before 1537, the year when the university was definitively established in Coimbra, transferred for its last time from Lisbon, a library was already in operation in the city. It was called Livraria de Estudo (Study Library). Based on the inventories of 1513 and 1532, more than 120 manuscript volumes were stored at the library. After the university refounding of 1537, the Livraria de Estudo was reinstalled and opened for students and professors, 4 hours a day. The statutes of 1559 already determined 6 hours of functioning a day, and the statutes of 1571 and 1597 called it livraria pública para lentes, estudantes e quaisquer pessoas outras (public library for lecturers, students and everybody else). In 1705 the library was closed and about 20 years later a new library was established-–the Biblioteca Joanina (Joanina Library, named after King João V). By the reform which occurred in 1901, the library was renamed Biblioteca Central da Universidade (Central Library of the university).

The current designation of the library, Biblioteca Geral da Universidade de Coimbra, came in 1924, and its current main building is from 1962. The library is divided in two buildings:

The Biblioteca Joanina (books before 1800)
The main centre Edifício Novo (the New Building, 1962) with over a million books ranging almost every possible field of study, 4 floors and over 7000 m2.

The library is open every day from 9:00 to 22:45.

External links
University of Coimbra General Library
 Coimbra University Presentation

University of Coimbra
Coimbra
Buildings and structures in Coimbra